The Memory of Eldurim is an open world action role-playing video game in development by Liminal Games. The game was released for Microsoft Windows via early access on Steam on February 7, 2014.

Gameplay 

The Memory of Eldurim is an open world action RPG.  Players can explore the world, defeating enemies and collecting equipment along the way.

The game does not feature a standard leveling system, but incremental improvement is achieved by each action taken.  There are no starting classes or roles, so the player become the summation of their actions and decisions.

Development 
The game was developed by video game developer Liminal Games using the CRYENGINE. The Memory of Eldurim is currently available on Steam as an Early Access game.

The game's last update was on January 29, 2016. The game never received the promised updates that would bring online features, and it was left out by the developers in the early-access state until the present day.

References

External links

Action role-playing video games
Dark fantasy video games
CryEngine games
Open-world video games
Cancelled Windows games
Vaporware video games